Sergei Nikolayevich Vakhteyev (born 11 February 1987) is a Russian former football player.

Club career
He made his debut in the Russian Football National League for FC Akron Tolyatti on 1 August 2020 in a game against FC Fakel Voronezh, he substituted Daur Kvekveskiri in the 57th minute.

References

External links
 
 Profile by Russian Football National League
 

1987 births
Sportspeople from Tolyatti
Living people
Russian footballers
Association football forwards
FC Orenburg players
FC Neftekhimik Nizhnekamsk players
FC Znamya Truda Orekhovo-Zuyevo players
FC Lada-Tolyatti players
FC Akron Tolyatti players